Bozdoğan is a Turkish surname formed by the combination of the Turkish words boz ("gray, grey") and doğan ("falcon").  Notable people with the name include:
 Ahmet Mazhar Bozdoğan (born 1953), Turkish swimmer
 Can Bozdoğan (born 2001), German footballer of Turkish descent

References

Turkish-language surnames